Mieux qu'ici-bas is francophone Canadian pop singer Isabelle Boulay's third studio album, released in September 2000.  It was led by the hit single "Parle-moi" which was released about the same time. The album achieved a great success in Belgium (Wallonia) and France, where it reached the top ten and stayed on the chart for about two years.

Track listing

 "Parle-moi" (J. Kapler) — 3:46
 "Jeu tentant" (Jean Fauque)  — 3:46
 "Un Jour ou l'autre" (Patrick Bruel, Marie-Florence Gros) — 3:49
 "Jamais assez loin" (Zachary Richard, Louise Forestier) — 3:49
 "Trop de choses" (Jean Fauque) — 4:05
 "Cœur combat" (Didier Golemanas, Daniël Seff) — 4:11
 "Mieux qu'ici-bas" (Didier Golemanas, Daniël Seff) — 4:08
 "Je m'en contenterai" (Serge Lama) — 3:40
 "Quand vos cœurs m'appellent" (J. Kapler) — 3:40
 "Je n'voudrais pas t'aimer" (Zachary Richard) — 4:12
 "C'était notre histoire" (Élisabeth Anaïs) — 3:54
 "Quelques pleurs" (J. Kapler) — 4:52
 "Où tu t'en vas?" (Patrick Bruel, Marie-Florence Gros) — 4:20
 "Nos Rivières" (Didier Golemanas, Daniël Seff) — 4:35

Charts

Certifications

References

2000 albums
Isabelle Boulay albums
V2 Records albums